Coast Guard Base Alameda also referred to as Coast Guard Island is an artificial island in the Oakland Estuary between Oakland and Alameda, California. It is home to several major United States Coast Guard commands and cutters, including the Coast Guard Pacific Area. It is one of the largest Coast Guard bases on the West Coast. From 1942 until 1982, the island was the site of the Coast Guard's recruiting training center (boot camp), enlisting and training hundreds of thousands of Coast Guardsmen including many of the 214,239 who served in the Pacific and European Theaters of World War II.

The  island is situated in the historic Brooklyn Basin, now known as Embarcadero Cove. It is within Alameda city limits, but is tied to land only via a bridge from Dennison Street in Oakland.

Tenant commands
The island houses a number of U.S. Coast Guard commands and its facilities are managed by Base Alameda. Over 1200 personnel are assigned to the island. Area commands include:

 Pacific Area and Defense Force West
 Maritime Intelligence Fusion Center Pacific (MIFC-PAC)
 Sector San Francisco (Prevention Department; the remainder of Sector San Francisco is housed at nearby Yerba Buena Island)
 Pacific Regional Fisheries Training Center (formerly known as Training Team West)
 Maritime Safety and Security Team 91105 (MSST 91105)

It is also the homeport for four Legend-class cutters:

 USCGC Bertholf (WMSL-750)
 USCGC Waesche (WMSL-751)
 USCGC Stratton (WMSL-752)
 USCGC Munro (WMSL-755)

Coast Guard Island also houses and supports a number of other Coast Guard commands with detachments or regional offices located on the island, including:

 Coast Guard Investigative Service (CGIS) Pacific Region
 Legal Service Command West
 Personnel Service Center Detachment Alameda
 Coast Guard Office of Civil Rights Detachment Region 3
 Coast Guard Office of Civilian Human Resources (CG-121), Human Resources Operations Division, Human Resources Center-West
 Surface Forces Logistics Center (SFLC) Detachment Alameda
 Shore Infrastructure Logistics Center Detachment Alameda
 Coast Guard Office of Contingency and Deployable Logistics, DOL-42 (Pacific Area) and DOL-43 ((Atlantic Area)
 Atlantic Area International Port Security Detachment Alameda
 Electronic Support Detachment (ESD) Alameda

Coast Guard Electronic Support Unit (ESU) Alameda and Naval Engineering Support Unit (NESU) Alameda were also located on the island until those units were decommissioned in 2013. The functions and capabilities of the units remain as departments within Base Alameda.

The facilities on Coast Guard Island also include an Integrated Support Command (ISC), enlisted barracks, a medical and dental clinic, and public works facilities to service the island.

History and formation
Originally known as Government Island, this artificial island was formed in 1913 by the dredging project that extended the Oakland Estuary to San Leandro Bay. The Coast Guard first came to the island in 1926 when it established "Base 11" under an Executive Order signed in September 1931 that gave title to a  tract for a permanent base. Improvements were started at that time and by 1933 included streets, utilities, spur tracks, a trestle bridge from Oakland, a transformer station, and rebuilding of the existing wharves. The cost was more than one and a half million dollars and provided facilities for Base 11 and the Coast Guard Store (warehouses).

Establishment
The shore establishment expanded in 1939 with the amalgamation of the Lighthouse Service. A training center was established in 1940 to meet the service's increased personnel needs.

The first contract provided for five barracks, mess hall and galley, engineering and administration buildings, an infirmary, roadways, heating, plumbing, electrical and fire protection. The contract was awarded February 21, 1942 and completed June 30, 1942 at a cost of $1,680,082.94. Additional contracts for another half million dollars provided for additional barracks, clothing issue building, paving a drill field, band room, incinerator, anti-aircraft trainer building, and docks for small boats.

Recruit Training Center
The training center was first opened on June 1, 1942 with accommodations for 900 men. It was solely to train recruits. Specialty training was added later to include fireman, signalman, laundryman, radioman, boatswain's mate, cooks and bakers, and port security.

After the war, Government Island remained a Coast Guard Training Center with addition of the Weather Bureau, Internal Auditors, and the Bureau of Roads. During the late 1960s the Training & Supply Center was the Coast Guard's largest field unit on the West Coast. The Training Center graduated 60-100 seaman apprentices and fireman apprentices each week. The Supply Center provided support to the western area districts including Squadron One and Squadron Three in Vietnam. The cutters Taney, Gresham, and Barataria were homeported on the island at the time.

In 1982, the Training Center was closed and recruit training was moved to United States Coast Guard Training Center Cape May, New Jersey, where it remains today.  Support Center Alameda was established June 1, 1982 and the island was renamed Coast Guard Island. The Coast Guard Pacific Area, Coast Guard 11th District (then known as Coast Guard 12th District), and Marine Safety Office San Francisco moved from downtown San Francisco to the island. On June 24, 1987, Maintenance & Logistics Command Pacific was established and located on the island until its decommissioning. The Support Center was redesignated as Integrated Support Command Alameda on March 15, 1996, and today is Base Alameda.

Notable Commanders
 World War II Era Rear Admiral A. J. Carpenter, Commanding Officer of Alameda and District 3. 
 Vietnam War Era Captain Henry P. Kniskern, Commanding Officer
 Captain Michael L. Woolard, Commanding Officer 2011–2015. 
Captain Jonathan P. Hickey, Commanding Officer 2015–2018.

See also
 Islands of San Francisco Bay
 San Francisco Bay Area
 Integrated Support Command Alameda

References

External links
 Coast Guard description

Geography of Alameda, California
Islands of Alameda County, California
Islands of Northern California
United States Coast Guard bases
Military facilities in the San Francisco Bay Area
Islands of San Francisco Bay